The Hunter HC 50 is an American sailboat that was designed by the Hunter Design Team as a "long distance express cruiser" and first built in 2000.

The HC 50 is a development of the one-off racers Hunter's Child and Route 66, with a design goal of producing a fast cruising sailboat. The HC designation is an acknowledgment of its design ancestry.

The design designation can be confused with the Hunter 50 CC of 2009 and the Hunter 50 AC of 2010.

Production
The design was built by Hunter Marine in the United States starting in 2000, but it is now out of production.

Design
The Hunter HC 50 is a recreational keelboat, built predominantly of vacuum bag moulded fiberglass, with a foam-core deck. It has a cutter rig, a raked stem, a walk-through open reverse transom with a swimming platform and folding ladder, an internally mounted spade-type rudder controlled by a tiller and a fixed fin keel. It displaces  and carries  of lead ballast in the keel and also  of flooding water ballast in each of two lateral tanks, filled with electric pumps. The design has  stand-up headroom below decks.

Factory standard equipment included a fully battened mainsail, 95% roller furling jib on the inner forestay, hank-on light-wind headsail, gear for an asymmetrical spinnaker, aluminum mast tripod support, mainsheet traveler mounted on a stainless steel arch, eight opening deck hatches, four two-speed self tailing winches,  stanchions mounting triple lifelines, anodized spars, fixed bowsprit with an anchor roller and electric windlass, stern "picnic" anchor locker, hot and cold water transom shower, a gimbaled nav station, fully enclosed head with shower, private forward and dual aft cabins, a dinette table, dual sinks, two-burner gimbaled liquid petroleum gas stove and oven, refrigerator and freezer, a water-maker, a fog bell and six life jackets. Factory options included a carbon fiber mast, wheel steering, a knotmeter, GPS, radar, autopilot, depth sounder, air conditioning, electric halyard winch and a bimini top.

Operational history
The HC 50 was named Cruising World's Best Performance Cruiser for 2001, describing it as "a boat that brings such offshore-racing innovations as water ballast and a gimballed nav station into a cruising context."

See also
List of sailing boat types

Similar sailboats
C&C 50
Marlow-Hunter 47
Marlow-Hunter 50
Marlow-Hunter 50 Center Cockpit

References

External links
Official brochure

Keelboats
2000s sailboat type designs
Sailing yachts
Sailboat type designs by Hunter Design Team
Sailboat types built by Hunter Marine